This is a list of Administrative Heads of Macquarie Island.

Macquarie Island legal status
The following table outlines the legal status and administrative arrangements covering Macquarie Island.

Officers in charge Macquarie Island Meteorological Station
The following officers were appointed to manage the Macquarie Island Meteorological Station under the Director of the Australian Bureau of Meteorology.

See also

Macquarie Island
Australian Antarctic Territory

References

 
Macquarie Island Administrative Heads
Macquarie Island Administrative Heads